Monroe is an unincorporated community in Hart County, Kentucky, in the United States.

History
A post office called Monroe was established in 1878, and remained in operation until it was discontinued in 1919. The community was named for President James Monroe.

References

Unincorporated communities in Hart County, Kentucky
Unincorporated communities in Kentucky